Lobanovo is the name of several rural localities in Russia:

 Lobanovo, Perm Krai, a selo and the administrative center of Lobanovskoye Rural Settlement, Permsky District, Perm Krai
 Lobanovo, Gus-Khrustalny District, Vladimir Oblast, a village in Posyolok Krasnoye Ekho, Gus-Khrustalny District, Vladimir Oblast
 Lobanovo, Selivanovsky District, Vladimir Oblast, a village in Novlyanskoye Rural Settlement, Selivanovsky District, Vladimir Oblast
 Lobanovo, Sudogodsky District, Vladimir Oblast, a village in Lavrovskoye Rural Settlement, Sudogodsky District, Vladimir Oblast
 Lobanovo, Kichmengsko-Gorodetsky District, Vologda Oblast, a village in Kichmegnskoye Rural Settlement, Kichmengsko-Gorodetsky District, Vologda Oblast